The 2020 NASCAR Racing Experience 300 was a NASCAR Xfinity Series race held on February 15, 2020. It was contested over 120 laps on the  asphalt superspeedway. It was the first race of the 2020 NASCAR Xfinity Series season. JR Motorsports driver Noah Gragson collected his first career Xfinity Series win in a finish under caution.

Report

Background 
Daytona International Speedway is one of three superspeedways to hold NASCAR races, the other two being Indianapolis Motor Speedway and Talladega Superspeedway. The standard track at Daytona International Speedway is a four-turn superspeedway that is 2.5 miles (4.0 km) long. The track's turns are banked at 31 degrees, while the front stretch, the location of the finish line, is banked at 18 degrees.

Entry list 

 (R) denotes rookie driver.
 (i) denotes driver who is ineligible for series driver points.

Practice

First practice 

Final practice 

Qualifying 
Colin Garrett, Tommy Joe Martins, Ross Chastain, and A. J. Allmendinger did not qualify for the race. Josh Bilicki, J. J. Yeley, and Mike Harmon made the field based on 2019 owner points, while Joe Nemechek made the field as a past champion. After qualifying, it was announced that Chastain would take over for Jeff Green in the No. 38.

Qualifying results

Race

Race results

Stage Results 
Stage One
Laps: 30

Stage Two
Laps: 30

Final Stage Results 

Laps: 60

Race statistics 

 Lead changes: 12 among 8 different drivers
 Cautions/Laps: 7 for 28
 Red flags: 1
 Time of race: 2 hours, 11 minutes, and 44 seconds
 Average speed:

Media

Television 
The NASCAR Racing Experience 300 was carried by FS1 in the United States. Adam Alexander, Stewart-Haas Racing driver Clint Bowyer, and Team Penske driver Brad Keselowski called the race from the booth, with Regan Smith and Matt Yocum covering pit road.

Radio 
The Motor Racing Network (MRN) called the race for radio, which was simulcast on SiriusXM NASCAR Radio. Dave Moody and Jeff Striegle anchored the action from the booth. Mike Bagley called the action from Turns 1 & 2, Kyle Rickey worked the backstretch, and Steve Post called the race through turns 3 & 4. NASCAR Hall of Fame Executive Director Winston Kelley anchored pit road and was joined by Dillon Welch.

Standings after the race 

 Drivers' Championship standings

Note: Only the first 12 positions are included for the driver standings.

References 

NASCAR races at Daytona International Speedway
2020 in sports in Florida
NASCAR Racing Experience 300
2020 NASCAR Xfinity Series